Xestoiulus is a genus of millipedes belonging to the family Julidae.

The species of this genus are found in Central Europe.

Species:
 Xestoiulus bjelasnicensis (Verhoeff, 1898) 
 Xestoiulus blaniuloides (Verhoeff, 1893)

References

Julida
Millipede genera